The year 2009 is the 9th year in the history of Deep, a mixed martial arts promotion based in Japan. In 2009 Deep held 20 events beginning with, Deep: Fan Thanksgiving Festival.

Title fights

Events list

Deep: Fan Thanksgiving Festival

Deep: Fan Thanksgiving Festival was an event held on February 10, 2009 at Korakuen Hall in Tokyo.

Results

Deep: 40 Impact

Deep: 40 Impact was an event held on February 20, 2009 at Korakuen Hall in Tokyo.

Results

Deep: Kobudo Fight 6

Deep: Kobudo Fight 6 was an event held on March 1, 2009 at Kobudo Martial Arts Communication Space Tiger Hall in Nagoya.

Results

Deep: clubDeep Tokyo: Protect Cup Final

Deep: clubDeep Tokyo: Protect Cup Final was an event held on March 14, 2009 at Shinkiba 1st Ring in Tokyo.

Results

Deep: 41 Impact

Deep: 41 Impact was an event held on April 16, 2009 at Korakuen Hall in Tokyo.

Results

Deep: Kobudo Fight 7

Deep: Kobudo Fight 7 was an event held on May 5, 2009 at Kobudo Martial Arts Communication Space Tiger Hall in Nagoya.

Results

Deep: clubDeep Osaka

Deep: clubDeep Osaka was an event held on June 7, 2009 at Azalea Taisho Hall in Osaka.

Results

Deep: Toyama Impact

Deep: Toyama Impact was an event held on June 28, 2009 at Toyama Techno Hall in Toyama.

Results

Deep: 42 Impact

Deep: 42 Impact was an event held on June 30, 2009 at Korakuen Hall in Tokyo.

Results

Deep: Nagoya Impact

Deep: Nagoya Impact was an event held on July 26, 2009 at Zepp Nagoya in Nagoya.

Results

Deep: clubDeep Hachioji

Deep: clubDeep Hachioji was an event held on August 2, 2009 at Keio Plaza Hotel in Tokyo.

Results

Deep: 43 Impact

Deep: 43 Impact was an event held on August 23, 2009 at Korakuen Hall in Tokyo.

Results

Deep: Osaka Impact

Deep: Osaka Impact was an event held on August 30, 2009 at Zepp Osaka in Osaka.

Results

Deep: Hamamatsu Impact

Deep: Hamamatsu Impact was an event held on September 27, 2009 at Act City in Hamamatsu.

Results

Deep: 44 Impact

Deep: 44 Impact was an event held on October 10, 2009 at Korakuen Hall in Tokyo.

Results

Deep: Kobudo Fight 8

Deep: Kobudo Fight 8 was an event held on October 18, 2009 at Kobudo Martial Arts Communication Space Tiger Hall in Nagoya.

Results

Deep: clubDeep Kyoto

Deep: clubDeep Kyoto was an event held on November 3, 2009 at Terrsa Hall in Kyoto.

Results

Deep: Fan Thanksgiving Festival 2

Deep: Fan Thanksgiving Festival 2 was an event held on November 10, 2009 at Korakuen Hall in Tokyo.

Results

Deep: Cage Impact 2009

Deep: Cage Impact 2009 was an event held on December 19, 2009 at Differ Ariake in Tokyo.

Results

Deep: Future King Tournament 2009

Deep: Future King Tournament 2009 was an event held on December 27, 2009 at Gold's Gym South Tokyo Annex in Tokyo.

Results

See also 
 List of Deep champions
 List of Deep events

References

Deep (mixed martial arts) events
2009 in mixed martial arts